Marooned may refer to:
 Marooning, the intentional act of abandoning someone in an uninhabited area

Film and television 
 Marooned (1933 film), a British drama film
 Marooned (1969 film), an American science-fiction film
 Marooned (1994 film), a short film
 Marooned (2004 film), a football documentary
 Marooned (2019 film), a short film included on the home media releases of Abominable
 "Marooned" (Legends of Tomorrow), an episode of Legends of Tomorrow
 "Marooned" (Red Dwarf), an episode of Red Dwarf
 Marooned with Ed Stafford, a documentary television series

Other uses
 File:Marooned by Edward J Gregory.jpg, the 1887 oil painting by Edward John Gregory
 Marooned (novel), by Martin Caidin, 1964
 Marooned (band), an American a cappella band 
 "Marooned" (instrumental), on Pink Floyd's 1994 album The Division Bell
 "Marooned", a song from the album Death or Glory by Running Wild

See also 
 
 
 Maroon (disambiguation)
 Maroons (disambiguation)